Alexandra Korolkova (born 1984) is a Russian typeface designer. She was awarded the infrequently presented Prix Charles Peignot in 2013 by the Association Typographique Internationale, becoming the first Russian prizewinner.

Korolkova's best-known work is probably the PT Fonts project, a partly open-source project commissioned by the Russian Ministry of Communications as a single family able to support all the common variations of the Cyrillic script.

Korolkova works for the company ParaType and studied at the Moscow State University of Printing Arts. She is the author of the book Living Typography and has also given lectures on Cyrillic letter structure. She has also designed the typeface FF Carina for FontShop.

References

External links
 Fonts on MyFonts (some self-released)
 ParaType page
 Personal website

Living people
Russian designers
1984 births
Russian typographers and type designers